Michel Boulnois (31 October 1907 – 30 November 2008) was a 20th-century French organist and composer.

Biography 
Born in Paris in a family of musicians, his father, Joseph Boulnois, was also an organist and composer. Michel Boulnois was only eleven years old when his father, a sub-officer, died at the age of 34 from the 1918 flu pandemic.

Michel followed the same artistic path, that of the Conservatoire de Paris where he was a student of Noël Gallon, Marcel Dupré, Henri Büsser, among others. He also followed courses of musical analysis by Nadia Boulanger. He graduated from the conservatory in 1937 with a first prize of organ. He became titular organist of the organ of the Église Saint-Philippe-du-Roule of Paris in 1937, a position he held for 53 years until 1990. He composed pieces for organ, orchestra and chamber music.

He died on 30 November 2008 in Provins, aged 101. He was married with Suzanne Sohet, composer and music educator.

Principal works 
Organ:
1944: Symphonie pour grand orgue
1952: 3 pièces pour la fête du Saint-Sacrement
1959–1963: Messe pour la fête de l'Annonciation
1974: Variations et fugue sur le Veni Creator
1976: Élégie pour violon et orgue.

Sources 
 Dictionnaire de la musique Les hommes et leurs œuvres, Marc Honegger, éditions Bordas

References

External links 
 Michel Boulnois on musimem.com
 Michel Boulnois on Musicalics
 Michel Boulnois on Planète partitions 
 Michel Boulnois on Cathedrale-catholique-clermont.fr

French classical organists
French male organists
20th-century French composers
Conservatoire de Paris alumni
French composers of sacred music
French centenarians
1907 births
Musicians from Paris
2008 deaths
20th-century organists
20th-century French male musicians
Men centenarians
Male classical organists